The 2019–20 season was Denizlispor's 20th season in the Süper Lig and their 53rd in existence. The club won the TFF First League previous season and also be competing in the Süper Lig after 9 years.

Transfers

In

Out

First team squad

|-
|colspan=12 align=center|Players sold or loaned out after the start of the season

Statistics

Pre-season and friendlies

Pre-season

Mid-season

Süper Lig

League table

Results summary

Pld = Matches played; W = Matches won; D = Matches drawn; L = Matches lost; GF = Goals for; GA = Goals against; GD = Goal difference; Pts = Points

Results by round

Matches

Turkish Cup

3rd Round

4th Round

5th Round

Round of 16

Notes

References

Denizlispor football seasons
Denizlispor